Jorge Enrique Abello (born 28 February 1968) is a Colombian actor.

Abello has performed roles in telenovelas, such as: the original version of La Viuda de Blanco (The Widow in white) 1996, as Dr. Dimas Pantoja, opposite Yolandita Monge as Haydée Blanco, Las Ejecutivas (The Executives) 1996, La Mujer en el Espejo (The Woman in the Mirror) 1997, Perro amor (Dog Love) 1998, and the leading man in the original version of Betty La Fea (Betty, the ugly) 1999, opposite leading lady Ana Maria Orozco, Julius 1999, Eco moda (Echo Fashion) 2001, La Costeña y el Cachaco (The coastal girl and the city guy) (2003), Anita no te Rajes (Anita don't screw up) 2004, opposite leading lady Ivonne Montero & Merlina, Mujer Divina" (2005–06)& En los tacones de Eva" (In Eva's heels) (2006), he worked as well in the telenovela "Aquí no hay quien viva" (no one could live here) in 2008 playing the role of Fernando; this has been his first foreign work. Later on in 2010 he worked in the Colombian version of Greys Anatomy A corazon abierto, as Mauricio Hernandez, the Colombian role for Mark Sloan. Finally in 2012 he played the role of Cristobal in the telenovela Donde está Elisa? (Where is Elisa?).

Filmography

References

External links
 

1968 births
Living people
Colombian male telenovela actors